John Frederick Hiskins (8 August 1878 – 25 November 1946) was an Australian rules footballer who played for Essendon in the Victorian Football League (VFL) during the early 1900s.

Hiskins came from a family of 16 and hailed from Lake Moodermere near Wahgunyah, Victoria.

Hiskins played in Excelsior's 1900 Ovens & Murray Football League premiership prior to making his VFL debut in round 15, 1900 against South Melbourne.

Hiskins was a half forward and topped the league's goalkicking in the 1901 VFL season with 34 goals, finishing the year in Essendon's premiership side. He would have kicked more that year had it not been for an inaccurate game against South Melbourne which saw him kick two goals and ten behinds.

Hiskins regularly used the place kick to shoot at goal and represented Victoria against South Australia  in Adelaide in 1902.

After three years in Western Australia he returned to Essendon in 1906 and played one final season. Hiskins managed to squeeze in a game for Wahgunyah in June 1906.

Hiskins later played with Rutherglen in 1907, featuring in their 1907 Ovens & Murray Football League premiership.

His younger brothers Arthur, Rupe and Stan were also VFL footballers while his son Jack played for Essendon in the 1930s.

External links

Essendon Football Club profile
Hiskins prominent for years!

References

Holmesby, Russell and Main, Jim (2007). The Encyclopedia of AFL Footballers. 7th ed. Melbourne: Bas Publishing.

1878 births
1946 deaths
Australian rules footballers from Victoria (Australia)
Australian Rules footballers: place kick exponents
Rutherglen Football Club players
Essendon Football Club players
Essendon Football Club Premiership players
VFL Leading Goalkicker Medal winners
One-time VFL/AFL Premiership players